Olli-Pekka "Lelu" Ojansivu (born 31 December 1987) is a retired Finnish professional volleyball player who was a member of the Finland men's national volleyball team.

Career
Ojansivu started his career in Vammalan Lentopallo. When Ojansivu turned sixteen years old he didn't go to Kuortane like many promising junior players do. He stayed in Vammala and started training in Finnish league team Vammalan Lentopallo. He played his first game in Finnish Champion league at the age of 16 in season 2004. His first whole season in Finnish Champion league was season 2006. He was best server in the whole league and ranked fifth amongst spikers. After the season Finnish volleyball federation chose him as the best newcomer in the league. 2005 season in Vammala was also great and Ojansivu ranked as 2nd best server in the whole league and was again 5th best spiker in league.

After many seasons in Vammala Ojansivu made contract with Pielaveden Sampo. In Sampo Ojansivu won his first season Finland Cup-Champion and in Finland league silver medal. Sport Channel chose him best opposite player in whole league.

In the 2008–2009 season, he played in the Finland Champion league in Pielaveden Sampo.

He signed a contract with CVM Tomis Constanța in July 2012. The club will represent Romania in the CEV Champions League.

National team
Ojansivu's national debut was against Estonia in Olympic Qualification in 2007. The score was 23–23 when Olli-Pekka was substituted to court. He managed to serve back-to-back aces and Finland won the set. Since that match Ojansivu has been part of the national team.

Achievements
Personal
 2005–2006 Valepa (Best server and 2nd. best scorer of the league
 Best rookie in Finland league 2006
 2006–2007 Valepa (2nd. best server and 5th. best scorer of the league
 2008–2009 Pielaveden Sampo (Best scorer in Play – off games
 Sport Channel best opposite player 2008
 2009–2010 PAOK (3rd. best server and 2nd. best scorer of the league

Team
 Finland league champion 2009
 Finland Cup-Champion 2008, 2009
 Finland league silver 2008

References

1987 births
Living people
People from Sastamala
Finnish men's volleyball players
PAOK V.C. players
Finnish expatriate sportspeople in Greece
Finnish expatriate sportspeople in France
Finnish expatriate sportspeople in Iran
Finnish expatriate sportspeople in Romania
Finnish expatriate sportspeople in Russia
Finnish expatriate sportspeople in Turkey
Expatriate volleyball players in Greece
Expatriate volleyball players in France
Expatriate volleyball players in Iran
Expatriate volleyball players in Romania
Expatriate volleyball players in Russia
Expatriate volleyball players in Turkey
Sportspeople from Pirkanmaa